County Kilkenny was a constituency represented in the Irish House of Commons until 1800.

History
In the Patriot Parliament of 1689 summoned by James II, Kilkenny County was represented with two members.

Members of Parliament
1531 Rowland Fitzgerald, 2nd Baron of Burnchurch
1559 Nicholas White and Walter Gall
1585 Gerard Blancheville and Robert Rothe
1613–1615 Lucas Shee and Robert Grace, Baron of Courtown
1634–1635 Robert Grace, Baron of Courtown and Edmund Butler of Polestown
1639–1649 Pierce Butler (expelled) and Walter Walsh
1661–1666 Sir John Ponsonby and Colonel Daniel Redman

1689–1801

Notes

References

Bibliography

Constituencies of the Parliament of Ireland (pre-1801)
Historic constituencies in County Kilkenny
1800 disestablishments in Ireland
Constituencies disestablished in 1800